Babaoshan Subdistrict is a subdistrict on the southeast corner of Shijingshan District, Beijing, China. It borders Laoshan Subdistrict to the north, Wangshoulu Subdistrict to the east, Liuliqiao and Lugouqiao Subdistricts to the south, and Lugu Subdistrict to the west. As of 2020, it had a total population of 61,211.

This subdistrict was named after , which itself was named so for the 8 types of minerals that the mountain possessed.

History 
Babaoshan Subdistrict was converted from Babaoshan Area in August 1963.

Administrative divisions 
As of 2021, Babaoshan Subdistrict comprises 15 communities:

See also 
 List of township-level divisions of Beijing

References 

Shijingshan District
Subdistricts of Beijing